Bayuly (rich son) is one of three tribal confederation of Little jüz which generally occupies western Kazakhstan. Bayuly as a tribal confederation consists of 12 tribes or clans.

Bai-Uly includes 12 tribes – Alasha, Bersh, Adai, Taz, Alt’n, Baibakty, Zhappas, Kzylkurt, Esentemir, Maskar, Sherkesh, Tana.

The battle cry of Alasha is "BaiBarak!"

Population of Bai-Uly in 1897 was 600,000 people. (around 16.2% of all Kazakhs).

Kazakh tribes
History of Kazakhstan